Maria Katharina Helene Sebaldt (26 April 1930 in Berlin-Steglitz) is a German actress.

Life 
The daughter of a department head of the Paramount film distribution company took private acting lessons from 1946 to 1949 and passed an acting examination in 1951. As early as 1947 she made her stage debut in Sondershausen as Edeltraud Panse in Maximilian Böttcher's Krach im Hinterhaus. Numerous theater engagements followed, among others in Sondershausen, Berlin (Renaissance Theater, Theater Club British Center) and Munich.

From 1965 until his death in 2010, Maria Sebaldt was married to her colleague Robert Freitag. Together with Freitag's first wife, the actress Maria Becker, she created the cookbook Eat and Drink and Be Happy in 1997, Favorite dishes from Maria Becker & Maria Sebaldt.

Maria Sebaldt has a daughter, Katharina Freitag, and a grandson.

Film 
In 1953, Sebaldt made her film debut alongside Rudolf Prack in When Village Music Plays on Sunday Evening. Since then, film and television have been her artistic focus. She played in music films like Der Zigeunerbaron, dramas like Anastasia, the last daughter of the Tsar (with Lilli Palmer in the title role), comedies like Helmut Käutner's engagement in Zurich (with Lilo Pulver) and father, mother and nine children (with Heinz Erhardt), crime fiction like The Black Sheep after Gilbert Keith Chesterton (with Heinz Rühmann as Father Brown), and the gangster movie parody Oops, here's Eddie! (with Eddie Constantine ), westerns like Die Gejagt der Sierra Nevada and literary adaptations like Alfred Weidenmann's two-parter based on Thomas Mann's Buddenbrooks (with Hansjörg Felmy) and Helmut Käutner's adaptation of Carl Zuckmayer's Hauptmann von Köpenick. She often embodied sympathetic characters, but also cunning gangsters such as Virginia Peng in the real-life version of Manfred Schmidt's popular comic series Nick Knatterton.

Television 
Sebaldt also became popular through her roles in series such as I marry a family or as the caring Hannelore Wichert, which she embodied in the ZDF series The Wicherts from next door between 1986 and 1991. In addition, she had numerous guest appearances in series such as Tatort, Das Traumschiff, Der Kommissar, Derrick and Der Alte.

Radio and voice acting 
In addition, Sebaldt has worked extensively for radio (NDR, RIAS, SFB) and was a voice performer for internationally renowned theater colleagues as Antonella Lualdi (red and black), Eva Marie Saint (Toxic snow) and Joanne Woodward (No fear of sharp things and Eve with the three faces)

Selected filmography
Additional films can be found on German and Swedish databases.
 Such a Charade (1953)
 Beloved Life (1953)
 Street Serenade (1953)
 The Stronger Woman (1953)
 When The Village Music Plays on Sunday Nights (1953)
 The Little Czar (1954)
  The Perfect Couple (1954)
 The Gypsy Baron (1954)
 A Girl Without Boundaries (1955)
 Alibi (1955)
 Father's Day (1955)
 Love Without Illusions (1955)
 Night of Decision (1956)
The Story of Anastasia (1956)
 The Zurich Engagement (1957)
 Lemke's Widow (1957)
  A Woman Who Knows What She Wants (1958)
  (1958)
 Father, Mother and Nine Children (1958)
 Peter Shoots Down the Bird (1959)
 Nick Knatterton’s Adventure (1959)
 A Thousand Stars Aglitter (1959)
 I Learned That in Paris (1960)
 The Last of Mrs. Cheyney (1961)
 Barbara (1961)
 The Bird Seller (1962)
  (1963)
 Charley's Aunt (1963)
 A Mission for Mr. Dodd (1964)
 Los Pistoleros de Arizona (1965)
 Toutes griffes dehors (1982)
 Germaine Damar – Der tanzende Stern (2011)

References

External links
 

1930 births
Living people
German film actresses
Actresses from Berlin
20th-century German actresses
21st-century German actresses
People from Steglitz-Zehlendorf